The Politics of Dancing 3 is the seventh studio album by Paul van Dyk, released on 4 May 2015 by Ultra Music and Vandit. The album features 
many collaborations including Aly & Fila, Ummet Ozcan, Giuseppe Ottaviani, Las Salinas, Roger Shah, Jordan Suckley, and Sue McLaren.

The album is the third album from Paul van Dyk's legendary compilation The Politics of Dancing series (the first was released in 2001 and the second in 2005). Paul van Dyk said about the album : “The third Politics of Dancing’s sound is, to me, more about what I’m about than the first two albums even. With them, I took music from other people and mixed, remixed and articulated it into the releases. Now we’re talking about tracks that I’ve written and co-written with other artists. So this is pretty much my idea of what electronic music should sound like now. "Politics" is almost like a "sound dictionary" of where I’m at musically. For me it continues the theme/thread of the first two, whilst acknowledging the passage of time between the then and the now.”.

The album includes collaborations such as: Come With Me (We Are One) (with Ummet Ozcan), Lights (featuring Sue McLaren), Guardian (with Aly & Fila, featuring Sue McLaren) and Louder (with Roger Shah, featuring Daphne Khoo).

Track listing

References

External links 
 The Politics of Dancing 3 at Discogs
  

2015 albums
Paul van Dyk albums
Ultra Records albums
Vandit albums